Haskelite  is the brand name of a plywood, once made by the Michigan-based Haskelite Manufacturing Corporation. It was made from waterproof glue developed by Henry L. Haskell. The moldable plywood was originally called Ser-O-Ply. It was used in the construction of various vehicles including military tanks, boats, airplanes, buses, trucks, and automobiles. The plywood was manufactured with different characteristics depending on particular needs and then given a brand name.

Background 

Haskell invented a process for making a waterproof glue called "black albumin glue" from blood-albumin which was used to bond wood including a lightweight waterproof plywood which was initially known as Ser-O-Ply. The plywood was used for boats, airplanes, tanks, trucks, automobiles and rail cars. The plywood panels had various layers of crossed-grain ply veneers to create the thickness and strength. The sheets made this way were eventually given the brand trade name of "Haskelite" after the inventor.

Haskell formed a company for making plywood that ultimately became the Haskell Manufacturing Company in Ludington, Michigan, and the Haskelite Manufacturing Corporation in Grand Rapids, Michigan. The glue was applied cold and spread onto wood veneers with rollers. This pressure and heat made the bond between the veneers permanent and the glue became insoluble. The plywood was given brand names depending on its characteristics. Plymetl had metal faces and was used in construction of airtight clothes vaults for storing furs and expensive garments. Plymold was a plastic-based plywood that could be molded, and Phemaloid was a fire-resistant paneling.

Airplanes  

Haskelite was used for aircraft parts, especially fuselages and wings starting with the Curtiss two-place fighter Whistling Bill which was the first molded plywood based aircraft. Haskell plywood was also used for construction of experimental and commercial aircraft including a 1927 Johnson Twin-60 experimental airplane with 85% Haskelite plywood in its wings, seats, instrument board, and fuselage parts. The first successful commercial airplane it was used on was the 1937 Fairchild Aircraft F-46.

In 1927, the company manufactured aircraft body parts for Charles Lindbergh's Spirit of St. Louis single engine plane, and during World War II Haskelite was used for parts for airplane trainers, gliders, bombers, and transports including components for Britain's De Havilland Mosquito fighter bombers and the Cessna AT-17 Bobcat.

Duramold 

In 1939 a waterproof plywood called Duramold, consisting of thin veneers of wood and cloth joined together using glue, heat and pressure, and designed for aircraft construction was invented. Duramold weighed about one-third of the weight of the aluminum alloys used at the time whilst being stronger and an entire fuselage could be turned out in two halves then sealed together mechanically.

The General Bakelite Company and Haskelite Manufacturing joined the Clark Aircraft Company of Hagerstown, Maryland to manufacture planes designed by Virginius E. Clark using Duramold with additional financing provided by Howard Hughes.

Boats and canoes 
Haskelite was also used to make watercraft, including the Haskell canoe, which was made from a single sheet of birch and redwood plywood molded into the shape of a canoe using hydraulic presses and fastened at the bow and stern with a bent strip of ash.

The canoes were first made in 1916, put on the market for sale in 1917 and in 1930 lengthened to  instead of the original . The Haskell canoe was marketed, sold and used throughout the United States and Canada.

See also 

 Carrom Company
 Haskell Manufacturing Company
 Haskelite Manufacturing Corporation

References

Sources

External links 

Plywood
Brand name materials
Science and technology in Michigan